Paddy Bourke may refer to:

 Paddy Bourke (footballer) (1883–1930), Australian rules footballer
 Paddy Bourke (politician), Irish politician

See also
 Pat Bourke (disambiguation)